ICI TOU.TV is a French Canadian, video-on-demand website launched on January 26, 2010 by the Canadian Broadcasting Corporation, currently branded CBC/Radio-Canada.

ICI TOU.TV, a French-language streaming service, offers primarily French and Québécois (French Canadian) content, including movies, series, documentaries, entertainment, etc. They also offer some content from English-speaking countries like the US, UK, and the rest of Canada. English-language content is generally dubbed in French, without subtitles. 

ICI TOU.TV is geo-located and is only legally available in Canada. 

CBC/Radio-Canada also offers an English-language streaming service, CBC Gem, which includes a large library of English-language content, as well as some French- and other foreign-language content. The non-English content is generally offered with English subtitles though, not dubbing. 

CBC Gem and ICI TOU.TV are both free to watch in Canada, with ads. They also offer Premium, ad-free memberships for a reasonable monthly price ($4.99 and $6.99, respectively). Premium membership with one service does not give you Premium access to the other—though they are both CBC/Radio-Canada streaming services, they each require their own membership.

Both services offer free trials of varying lengths, generally 30 days.

History

At launch, the site offered 2000 hours of French-language television content, near high definition in quality, provided by several TV channels, such as Ici Radio-Canada Télé, Ici RDI, Ici ARTV, Télé-Québec, TV5Monde, TV5 Québec Canada, TFO, Radio Canada International, RTS (Switzerland) and RTBF (Belgium).

In February 2014, the site was re-branded as Ici TOU.TV as part of a plan to unify CBC's French-language outlets around a single brand.

In May 2018, it was announced that Bell Media, the National Film Board of Canada, TV5 Québec Canada, and V Media Group would contribute content to TOU.TV's premium Extra tier, as part of an effort to better compete with Netflix on the availability of Québécois and French-language content. Other distributors such as Télé-Quebec later joined the partnership. 

Bell Media left the partnership after the company's rival service, Crave, expanded into the French-language market. As a result, all of their conen previously found on Ici TOU.TV have since moved to the aforementioned service. The V section has also been removed later on after Bell Media brought the brand from V Media Group (now Remstar Media Group); it was the only brand the latter company licensed to Ici TOU.TV.

Available contents and sections

Contents found on the service mostly include original series from Radio-Canada's television networks and streaming services, as well as acquisitions from other distributors. While some can be watched for free with advertisement, those with the Extra label require a paid subscription to the service so that it can be accessed. Following the website rebrand in May 2018, contents are placed into sections such as the following:

Current

Création Ici Tou.tv
Extra
Véro.tv
Zone Jeunesse
Zone des petits
Ici Radio-Canada Télé
Ici Explora
Ici ARTV
Ici RDI
Télé-Québec
TV5/UnisTV/TV5MondePlus
France tv
rtbf.be
ONF/NFB
CBC Gem

Devices Supported

The ICI TOU.TV streaming platform supports access through most modern web browsers, as well as apps for iOS/iPadOS, Android and Android TV devices, Apple TV, Xbox One, Amazon Fire TV, Chromecast and Telus Optik TV set top boxes. It was previously available as an app on LG and Samsung Smart TVs, Windows 8, Xbox 360 and Rogers Cable set top boxes.

Geo-Location and Availability

ICI TOU.TV is geo-located and is only available in Canada.

References

External links 
  

Internet properties established in 2010
Ici Radio-Canada Télé
Streaming television
Canadian video on demand services
Quebec websites